Andrei Anatolyevich Alenichev (born 27 January 1971) is a Russian professional football coach and a former player.

Playing career
As a player, he made his debut in the Soviet Second League in 1990 for FC Mashinostroitel Pskov.

Personal life
He is the older brother of Dmitri Alenichev.

References

External sources
 

1971 births
Living people
People from Velikiye Luki
Soviet footballers
Russian footballers
Association football midfielders
Russian expatriate footballers
Expatriate footballers in Belgium
Expatriate footballers in Croatia
NK Samobor players
K.R.C. Genk players
Russian football managers
Sportspeople from Pskov Oblast